Julia Lynn Rodríguez (born 5 October 2001) is a Puerto Rican footballer who plays as a defender for college team Tampa Spartans and the Puerto Rico women's national team.

Early life
Rodríguez was raised in Orlando, Florida.

High school and college career
Rodríguez has attended the Timber Creek High School in Orlando, Florida and the University of Tampa in Tampa, Florida.

International career
Rodríguez represented Puerto Rico at the 2018 CONCACAF Women's U-17 Championship and the 2020 CONCACAF Women's U-20 Championship. She made her senior debut on 18 February 2021 in a friendly away match against the Dominican Republic.

References

2001 births
Living people
Puerto Rican women's footballers
Women's association football defenders
Puerto Rico women's international footballers
Soccer players from Orlando, Florida
American women's soccer players

University of Tampa alumni
College women's soccer players in the United States
American sportspeople of Puerto Rican descent